Empedrado Department is a  department of Corrientes Province in Argentina.

Settlements 
 Empedrado
 El Sombrero

External links 
 Empedrado City 

Departments of Corrientes Province